The 1902 West Virginia Mountaineers football team was an American football team that represented West Virginia University as an independent during the 1902 college football season. In its first and only season under head coach Harold J. Davall, the team compiled a 7–4 record and outscored opponents by a total of 219 to 87. Lewis O. Smith was the team captain.

Schedule

References

West Virginia
West Virginia Mountaineers football seasons
West Virginia Mountaineers football